In mathematics, a gradually varied surface is a special type of digital surfaces. It is a function from a 2D  digital space (see digital geometry) to an ordered set or a chain.    

The concept of the continuous function in digital space (can be called digitally continuous functions) was proposed by Azriel Rosenfeld in 1986. It is a function in which the value (an integer) at a digital point is the same or almost the same as its neighbors. In other words, if x  and y are two adjacent points in a digital space, |f(x) − f(y)| ≤ 1. 

So we can see that the gradually varied function is defined to be more general than the digitally continuous function. The gradually varied function was defined by L. Chen in 1989. 
 
An extension theorem related to above functions was mentioned by Rosenfeld (1986) and completed by Chen (1989).

The gradually varied surface has direct relationship to graph homomorphism.

References
L. Chen, The necessary and sufficient condition and the efficient algorithms for gradually varied fill, Chinese Sci. Bull. 35 (10), pp 870–873, 1990.
A Rosenfeld, `Continuous' functions on digital pictures, Pattern Recognition Letters, v.4 n.3, p. 177-184, 1986.
G. Agnarsson and L. Chen, On the extension of vertex maps to graph homomorphisms, Discrete Mathematics, Vol 306, No 17, pp. 2021–2030,  2006.
L. Boxer, Digitally continuous functions, Pattern Recognition Letters,  Vol 15, No 8, pp 833–839, 1994.
L.M. Chen, Digital Functions and Data Reconstruction, Springer, 2013 

Digital geometry